Jaco Pastorius is the debut solo album by Jaco Pastorius, released in 1976 by Epic Records. The album was produced by Bobby Colomby, drummer and founder of Blood, Sweat & Tears.

Track listing
All tracks composed by Jaco Pastorius except where indicated.
 "Donna Lee" (Charlie Parker or Miles Davis) – 2:27
 "Come On, Come Over" (featuring Sam & Dave) (Jaco Pastorius, Bob Herzog) – 3:54
 "Continuum" – 4:33
 "Kuru/Speak Like a Child" (Pastorius, Herbie Hancock) – 7:43
 "Portrait of Tracy" – 2:22
 "Opus Pocus" – 5:30
 "Okonkolé Y Trompa" (Pastorius, Don Alias) – 4:25
 "(Used to Be a) Cha-Cha" – 8:57
 "Forgotten Love" – 2:14

Bonus tracks on 2000 reissue:
 "(Used to Be a) Cha-Cha" (alternate take, previously unreleased) – 8:49
 "6/4 Jam" (previously unreleased) – 7:45

Personnel
1. "Donna Lee" (Charlie Parker or Miles Davis) – 2:27
Jaco Pastorius – electric bass
Don Alias – congas

2. "Come On, Come Over" (featuring Sam & Dave) (Jaco Pastorius, Bob Herzog) – 3:54
Jaco Pastorius – electric bass
Don Alias – congas
Herbie Hancock – Hohner clavinet, Fender Rhodes electric piano
Narada Michael Walden – drums
Sam Moore – vocals
Dave Prater – vocals
Randy Brecker – trumpet
Ron Tooley – trumpet
Peter Graves – bass trombone
David Sanborn – alto sax
Michael Brecker – tenor sax
Howard Johnson – baritone sax

3. "Continuum" (Jaco Pastorius) – 4:33
Jaco Pastorius – electric bass
Herbie Hancock – Fender Rhodes electric piano
Alex Darqui – Fender Rhodes electric piano
Lenny White – drums
Don Alias – congas

4. "Kuru/Speak Like a Child" (Jaco Pastorius, Herbie Hancock) – 7:43
Jaco Pastorius – electric bass
Herbie Hancock – piano
Don Alias – congas, bongos
Bobby Economou – drums
David Nadien – violin
Harry Lookofsky – violin
Paul Gershman – violin
Joe Malin – violin
Harry Cykman – violin
Harold Kohon – violin
Stewart Clarke – viola
Manny Vardi – viola
Julian Barber – viola
Charles McCracken – cello
Kermit Moore – cello
Beverly Lauridsen – cello
Michael Gibbs – string arrangement

5. "Portrait of Tracy" (Jaco Pastorius) – 2:22
Jaco Pastorius – electric bass

6. "Opus Pocus" (Jaco Pastorius) – 5:30
Jaco Pastorius – electric bass
Wayne Shorter – soprano sax
Herbie Hancock – Fender Rhodes electric piano
Othello Molineaux – steel drums
Leroy Williams – steel drums
Lenny White – drums
Don Alias – percussion

7. "Okonkole Y Trompa" (Jaco Pastorius, Don Alias) – 4:25
Jaco Pastorius – electric bass
Peter Gordon – French horn
Don Alias – okonkolo, iya, congas, afuche

8. "(Used to Be a) Cha Cha" (Jaco Pastorius) – 8:57
Jaco Pastorius – electric bass
Hubert Laws – piccolo, flute
Herbie Hancock – piano
Lenny White – drums
Don Alias – congas

9. "Forgotten Love" (Jaco Pastorius) – 2:14
Jaco Pastorius – electric bass
Herbie Hancock – piano
David Nadien – violin
Harry Lookofsky – violin
Paul Gershman – violin
Joe Malin – violin
Harry Cykman – violin
Harold Kohon – violin
Matthew Raimondi – violin
Max Pollinkoff – violin
Arnold Black – violin
Stewart Clarke – viola
Manny Vardi – viola
Julian Barber – viola
Al Brown – viola
Charles McCracken – cello
Kermit Moore – cello
Beverly Lauridsen – cello
Alan Shulman – cello
Richard Davis – bass
Homer Mensch – bass
Michael Gibbs – string arrangement, conductor

Bonus tracks on 2007 reissue

10. "(Used to Be a) Cha-Cha" (alternate take, previously unreleased) (Jaco Pastorius) – 8:49
same as for track 8

11. "6/4 Jam" (previously unreleased) – 7:45
Jaco Pastorius – electric bass
Herbie Hancock – Fender Rhodes electric piano
Lenny White – drums
Don Alias – congas

See also
Jaco Pastorius discography

References

External links

 www.JacoPastorius.com
 Jaco Pastorius - Jaco Pastorius (1976) album releases & credits at Discogs
 Jaco Pastorius - Jaco Pastorius (1976) album to be listened on Spotify
 Jaco Pastorius - Jaco Pastorius (1976) album to be listened on YouTube

Jaco Pastorius albums
1976 debut albums
Albums produced by Bobby Colomby